Gabriel Ruhumbika (born 1938) is a Tanzanian novelist, short story writer, translator and academic. His first novel, Village in Uhuru, was published in 1969. He has written several subsequent novels in Swahili. He has also taught literature at a number of universities, and is currently a professor of Comparative Literature at the University of Georgia in the USA.

Early life
Ruhumbika was born in 1938 on Ukerewe Island in Lake Victoria. After studying for an undergraduate degree at the Makerere University in Uganda, he completed a PhD in African literature at the University of Paris-Sorbonne in France.

Career
Ruhumbika's first novel, Village in Uhuru, was published in 1969; this was the second English-language Tanzanian novel, after Peter Palangyo's Dying in the Sun (1968). This is a historical novel, based on real events relating to questions of ethnic and national identity in the context of the Tanganyika African National Union's struggles for sovereignty in Tanganyika (now Tanzania). Although Village in Uhuru was written and first published in English, Ruhumbika decided to write all of his subsequent novels in Swahili, a decision similar to that of Kenyan writer Ngũgĩ wa Thiong'o.

His Swahili-language novels, which mainly cover the Pan-African Uhuru Movement, include Miradi Bubu ya Wazalendo (Invisible Enterprises of the Patriots, 1991) and Janga Sugu la Wazawa (Everlasting Doom for the Children of the Land, 2002). He also wrote a collection of short stories, Uwike Usiwike Kutakuche (Whether the Cock Crows or Not It Dawns). Outside of his own writings, he has worked as a translator, mainly from French to Swahili, although he also translated Aniceti Kitereza's novel Myombekere and His Wife Bugonoka, Their Son Ntulanalwo, and Daughter Bulihwali from Kikerewe into English. Ruhumbika is a descendant of Kitereza and had unique access to the Kitereza’s manuscripts and diaries.

Ruhumbika has also taught literature at various universities, in both Africa and the USA. He has lectured at the University of Dar es Salaam (from 1970 to 1985) and Hampton University in Virginia (from 1985 to 1992). Since 1992, he has been a Professor of Comparative Literature at the University of Georgia.

References

Tanzanian novelists
1938 births
University of Georgia faculty
Makerere University alumni
English-language writers from Tanzania
Swahili-language writers
University of Paris alumni
People from Mwanza Region
Living people